Kemsing railway station serves Kemsing in Kent, England, although the station is located on the other side of the M26 motorway to the village. Train services are provided by Southeastern.

History
Freight facilities were withdrawn on 31 October 1960. The signal box closed on 30 September 1964.

The station has been unstaffed since 8 February 1985. The station buildings were demolished after the station became unstaffed. A PERTIS 'permit to travel' machine, located outside the station at road level on the 'up' side, suffices.

Facilities
Kemsing station is unstaffed although there is a self-service ticket machine available for ticket purchases. Both platforms have shelters, information screens and modern help points.

There is a small car park at the station entrance and local buses to Sevenoaks stop a short distance away from Kemsing, Noah's Ark.

Services 
All services at Kemsing are operated by Southeastern using  and  EMUs.

The typical off-peak service in trains per hour is:

 1 tph to 
 1 tph to 

There is no Sunday service at Kemsing, although trains do call on bank holidays.

References
References

Sources

External links 

Railway stations in Kent
Former London, Chatham and Dover Railway stations
Railway stations in Great Britain opened in 1874
Railway stations served by Southeastern
Buildings and structures in Sevenoaks District